David Norman Gill (November 24, 1887 – March 30, 1959) was head coach of the original Ottawa Senators from 1926 to 1931 and a prominent Ottawa sportsman.  He won the Stanley Cup in the 1926–27 season. Gill was a member of the War Canoe Club of New Edinburgh as a manager, and played rugby and hockey for that club as well as paddling. He played football for the Ottawa Rough Riders between 1912 and 1923.

He helped organize the Ottawa and District Amateur Hockey Association in 1920 and in 1925 joined the Ottawa Senators as manager, taking over as coach the following year, winning a Stanley Cup in 1927. Financial trouble necessitated the team selling off players to pay its debts and when Ottawa left the National Hockey League in 1931 for one year, he did not return to the Senators.

He died of heart problems on March 30, 1959.

Coaching record

References
Ottawa Citizen November 16, 1928 page 12 "The Manager of the Ottawa Hockey Team"
The Leader-Post, Regina Saskatchewan March 30, 1959 page 20 "David Gill Dies at 73"

Notes

1887 births
1959 deaths
Canadian Amateur Hockey Association secretaries
Canadian ice hockey coaches
Canadian sports executives and administrators
Ottawa District Hockey Association executives
Ottawa Senators coaches
Ottawa Senators (original) personnel
Stanley Cup champions
Stanley Cup championship-winning head coaches